The 1979 City of Lincoln Council election took place on 3 May 1979. This was on the same day as other local elections. This was the first election to be held under new ward boundaries. The entire council was up for election and the Conservative Party gained control of the council from the Democratic Labour Party.

Overall results

|-
| colspan=2 style="text-align: right; margin-right: 1em" | Total
| style="text-align: right;" | 33
| colspan=5 |
| style="text-align: right;" | 85,973
| style="text-align: right;" |

Ward results

Abbey (3 seats)

Birchwood (3 seats)

Boultham (3 seats)

Bracebridge (3 seats)

Carholme (3 seats)

Castle (3 seats)

Longdales (3 seats)

Minster (3 seats)

Moorland (3 seats)

Park (3 seats)

Tritton (3 seats)

References

1979
1979 English local elections
1970s in Lincolnshire